Longhurst is a surname. Notable people with the surname include:

Alan Longhurst (born 1925), Oceanographer
Albert Henry Longhurst (1876–1955), Indianologist and archaeologist
David Longhurst (1965–1990), English footballer
Eva Longhurst, one of Ontario Provincial Confederation of Regions Party candidates, 1990 Ontario provincial election
Garry Longhurst
Henry Longhurst (1909–1978), renowned British golf writer and commentator
Henry Longhurst (actor) (1891–1970), British actor
Jane Longhurst, school teacher murdered by Graham Coutts on 14 March 2003
John Longhurst (born 1940), organist for the Mormon Tabernacle Choir for 30 years
Kate Longhurst, English footballer
Mark Longhurst, UK television newsreader and journalist
Martha Longhurst, UK TV Coronation Street character
Neil Longhurst (born 1984), English cricketer
Robert Longhurst (born 1949), American sculptor from Schenectady, New York
Robyn Longhurst
Sue Longhurst, English actress, most famous for appearing in several X-rated comedies in the 1970s
Tony Longhurst (born 1957), Australian former racing driver and Australian Champion water skier
William Henry Longhurst (1819–1904), English organist at Canterbury Cathedral

See also
Longhurst Plateau, narrow, snow-covered extension of the Antarctic polar plateau located just west of Mount Longhurst
Hollinghurst
Longphuirt
Longhurst code, a set of codes used to represent biogeochemical provinces in oceanographic research
Longhirst